Zack & Quack is an animated children's television series created by Gili Dolev and Yvette Kaplan. Produced by Zodiak Media, the series premiered on Nick Jr. in the United Kingdom and Ireland on February 7, 2014. In the United States, it began airing on the same channel on April 7, 2014. It ended on February 5, 2017. 36 episodes were produced.

Premise
Set inside a pop-up book, the show follows the adventures of 7-year-old Zack and his best friend, Quack.

Episodes

Characters

 Zack (voiced by Thomas Albritton for the first 2 seasons and then voiced by Eli Paul for season 3) is the protagonist and a boy with brown hair. His best friends are Quack and Kira.
 Quack is a mallard, one of the main characters. Despite the fact he can't speak, everybody can understand his quacking. His quacking noises are provided by Nick Baker.
 Kira (voiced by Madison Zamor) is a girl with curly hair who can fix anything with a little creativity and various tools.
Hop (voiced by Maria May but the role was later taken over by Clancy Penny in season 3) and Skip (voiced by Regan Lutz for the entire run for the show) are sister squirrels.
Fluffy (voiced by Jesse Ray Sheps) is a hedgehog.
Belly-Up (voiced by Colin McFarlane) is a bullfrog.

References

External links
 
 

2010s South Korean animated television series
2014 Israeli television series debuts
2017 Israeli television series endings
2014 South Korean television series debuts
2017 South Korean television series endings
Channel 5 (British TV channel) original programming
English-language television shows
Treehouse TV original programming
Nickelodeon original programming
Nick Jr. original programming
British preschool education television series
British computer-animated television series
Animated preschool education television series
Television series by Banijay
2010s preschool education television series
2014 British television series debuts
2017 British television series endings
2010s British animated television series
2010s British children's television series
Animated television series about children
Animated television series about ducks